"This Time I'm in It for Love" is a song recorded by the American rock band Player. It was the second single from their self-titled first studio album. The song was released in early 1978 as the immediate follow-up to their biggest hit and debut single, "Baby Come Back". 

"This Time I'm in It for Love" spent four months on the US charts, hitting number 10 on the US Billboard Hot 100, and it is ranked as the 58th biggest hit of 1978. The song also reached number 12 in Canada.

Earlier versions
The song had originally been recorded by Austin Roberts in 1976 and by Cyndi Grecco in 1977 both on the Private Stock Records label. Their versions were released as singles but failed to chart. Grecco's version was a promotional single, and Roberts' version was released only in the UK.

Personnel
J.C. Crowley – lead vocals (verses), backing vocals (choruses), keyboards
Peter Beckett – lead vocals (choruses), lead and rhythm guitars
Ronn Moss – backing vocals (verses & choruses), bass guitar
John Friesen – drums, percussion

Chart performance

Weekly charts

Year-end charts

References

Bibliography
Joel Whitburn's Presents Top R&B/Hip-Hop Singles: 1942-2004, 2004, Record Research Inc.,

External links
 Lyrics of this song
  

1976 songs
1978 singles
Player (band) songs
Austin Roberts (singer) songs
Philips Records singles